The events of 1977 in anime.

Events
 Establishment of Magic Bus animation studio.

Releases

See also
1977 in animation

External links 
Japanese animated works of the year, listed in the IMDb

Anime
Anime
Years in anime